The most common sports in Gjilan are football, basketball, handball, volleyball, karate and boxing. Gjilan is known as a city of sport and the city of sport lovers. Gjilan is a city with an active citizen in several types of sports where is played by all ages and genders.

Football 

It is one of the most famous sports in Gjilan. The year 1922 marks the arrival of the first ball in Gjilan, from the Croatian Alojz Stepinac. In 1936, it was established the team with the name "Gajret" consisting mainly of Albanian players. On August 15, 1942, the club "Bashkimi" was formed in Gjilan, consisting mainly of Albanian players. It operated until just before the end of World War II . At the beginning of the year 1945, the football club "Crvena Zvezda" was established in Gjilan. The first members were Albanian. For a long time this club was dominated by Serbian leaders and players. When Kosovo’s autonomy was being taken in 1945, Albanian footballers refused to compete under the violent power, by joining the club "Drita", which was formed years ago. From 1947 to 1952, this football club participated in the Second League of Kosovo. The biggest success was in 2000 when it was declared the winner of the Cup and Super Cup of Kosovo. After the year 2000, there were two local teams "Drita"  and "Gjilan". This derby gathers a record number of attendees, usually between 10.000 and 15.000, no matter in which category the rival squads are. This also holds derby postwar record indestructible when Kosovo Cup final between the rival teams in the City Stadium in Pristina in June 2001 was attended by over 30,000 spectators. It is considered the biggest local derby in Kosovo, and in Albanian land banks, one of the three biggest local derbies in The Balkans, and one of the 25 biggest local derbies in Europe, as well as one of the 50 biggest local derbies in the world.m. It is a derby between fans and it became a tradition. The last derby was on the second of March 2014, when Drita won.
During the month of April 2012 a group of female athletes from Kosovo have stood for three weeks in the United States. Where they saw closely the developments in American sport. Over the past year we had 7 women football teams, and are soon expected to join the team of women from Gjilan.

Volleyball 

Volleyball as a sport was first seen at the “Mëhalla e Bejlerëve”. Until 1960 this particular sport was not officially structured and played, but in 1960 the first team was established, named "Partizani". In the years 1972 - 1973 the team was renamed to "Akademiku". Meanwhile the employees of the Textile Industry in Gjilan established "Tekstilisti". After the unification of "Tekstilisti" and "Akademiku" the team "Taftisoni" was established, which in 1981 - 1982 was declared Kosovo champion and successfully competes in the Second Federative League, until the Kosovan sport became independent and as a consequence the team was renamed to KV "Drita" like most of the other teams in Gjilan. Gjilan is known for females volleyball clubs too. KV "Drita" is known as one of the most important females club in Gjilan. clubs

Handball 
The handball remains one of the sports has left its mark in Gjilan. Handball started in Gjilan in 1955.Three years later establishes the first club called "Partizani".This team, for the very first time in handball history of Gjilan in 1962 developed the international match with "Taufiku" team from Egypt.In initiative of championship 1966/67, the team baptized "Bozhuri". When for the handballers are created better conditions, after the club found the support of Tobacco Industry.In 1991 the club was baptized "Drita". Since 1960 in Gjilan has originated the female handball, which had its ups and downs, but the biggest successes was after the war, when KH Drita was participating in two finals, while the most prominent players of the team were remain Mimoza Xhemajli Filloreta Ismaili, Valbona Rudaku, Arina Kçiku, Fahrije Hyskovci newer players that are the future of this team.

Basketball 

Basketball- with a long history, since 1956, Gjilan basketball reached his best in the first years after the Kosovo War. The first basketball team was named "Mlladost" and then it changed to "Drita". This team reached its biggest achievement in 1996 in it became champion of Kosovo. In the basketball team "Drita" in 2001 for the first time started coming players from European states making this basketball team one of the bests. In Gjilan there are also several women basketball teams.

Boxing 

In Gjilan's area many races with military features have been provided. The boxing club “Partizani” was initiated during 1972–1973. In 1992, the club was labeled “Drita” and it was contributing in this field till 1997. It has scored plenty of successful achievements. Gjilan’s boxing in the past was considered as a nest from where most of the famous boxers came out and now with a complete success they are managing to continue their work as coaches, where without sloth and without any material compensation, they want their gained knowledge over the years to disclose it to the youth of Gjilan, that don’t include a small number of those who want to deal with this sport. To highlight the results that came from Gjilan athletes in boxing there are many people that have merit, but one of the most people who deserved it is the coach Rexhep Jahiu, who made Liridon and Fatlume to render their culminating sportsman.

Karate 

The first karate club in Gjilan "Zenel Hajdini" (later renamed "Drita") was formed in 1972. The biggest achievements of KK "Drita" are noted after the war, by being one of the best teams in Kosovo, while international medals are uncountable.

Others 
Chess 
Table-tennis 
Swimming

References 

Sport in Kosovo
Gjilan